Ambica may refer to:

 Ambica, a spelling variant of the given name Ambika
Ambica Banerjee (1928–2013), Indian politician
Ambica Charan Mazumdar (1850–1922), Indian politician
Ambica Shrestha, Nepalese entrepreneur
Ambica Airlines, a defunct Indian airline

See also 
 Ambika (disambiguation)